Noelia Gil Pérez (born 23 May 1994) is a Spanish professional footballer who plays as a goalkeeper for Primera División club Alhama CF.

Early and personal life
Gil was born in the neighbourhood of Carabanchel, Madrid to a working-class family. Her father worked in a printing press and her mother worked as an administrative assistant. The family were Real Madrid supporters. Aside from football, she also participated in swimming and basketball. Gil is an only child.

Gil has a master's degree in teaching from the INEF department of Technical University of Madrid. She also holds qualifications in English.

Club career
Gil started playing in the Primera División with Atlético Madrid. Inclusive of time spent in the youth academy, she spent a total of 15 years at the club.

In January 2018, she joined newly-promoted Sevilla from Granadilla as competition for the goalkeeper position with Pamela Tajonar. In June 2019, after making 10 league appearances for the club, she announced her departure from Sevilla. At the start of the 2019–20 Segunda División season, she joined Málaga. She would spend one season at the club, conceding 21 goals, the fourth best record in the league. In 2020, she transferred from Málaga and Valencia.

International career
As an under-17 international, Gil won the 2011 UEFA U-17 Women's Championship.

References

1994 births
Living people
Women's association football goalkeepers
Spanish women's footballers
Primera División (women) players
Atlético Madrid Femenino players
UD Granadilla Tenerife players
Sevilla FC (women) players
Málaga CF Femenino players
Footballers from Madrid
Alhama CF players
Valencia CF Femenino players
Segunda Federación (women) players
Technical University of Madrid alumni
21st-century Spanish women